The 1868 United States presidential election in New York took place on November 3, 1868, as part of the 1868 United States presidential election. Voters chose 33 representatives, or electors to the Electoral College, who voted for president and vice president.

New York voted for the Democratic nominee, former Governor of New York Horatio Seymour, over the Republican nominee, General Ulysses S. Grant. Seymour won his home state by a very narrow margin of 1.18%, making him the first Democratic candidate since Franklin Pierce in 1852 to win the state. Seymour also became the first losing Democratic presidential candidate to win New York.

Results

See also
 United States presidential elections in New York

References

New York
1868
1868 New York (state) elections